Line Ellertsen (born 4 June 1998) is a Norwegian female handballer who plays for Aarhus United.

She also represented Norway at the 2016 Women's Youth World Handball Championship, placing 4th and at the 2015 European Women's U-17 Handball Championship, placing 11th.

Achievements
Junior World Championship: 
Silver Medalist: 2018

Individual awards 
 All-Star Right Back of the Junior World Championship: 2018

References
 

1998 births
Living people
Sportspeople from Stavanger
Norwegian female handball players 
Norwegian expatriate sportspeople in Denmark